Telémaco Susini (January 27, 1856 – June 1, 1936) was an Argentinian physician.

People from Buenos Aires
Argentine physicians
1856 births
1935 deaths
Argentine people of Italian descent